Mike Oldfield's Wonderland is a compilation album by Mike Oldfield released in 1980 on vinyl in the Netherlands & Germany. The album features a new mix of "Blue Peter" known as the Dutch mix and a shorter version of "Wonderful Land" as found on Elements Box.

Another compilation released later that year, Music Wonderland, with a similar title has been reissued on CD worldwide, although it has a different track listing.

Track listing

Side one
 "In Dulci Jubilo" (2:49)
 "Tubular Bells" (excerpt) (9:35)
 "Portsmouth" (2:02)
 "Hergest Ridge" (excerpt) (7:55)
 "North Star/Platinum Finale" (4:43)

Side two
 "Blue Peter" (Dutch mix) (2:06)
 "Ommadawn" (excerpt) (7:10)
 "Wonderful Land" (edit) (2:50)
 "Incantations" (excerpt) (8:40)
 "Guilty" (live) (4:02)

References 

Mike Oldfield compilation albums
1980 compilation albums